Songs of Love and Death is the debut studio album by the German symphonic metal band Beyond the Black. It was released in February 2015 on Airforce1 Records.

Track listing

Personnel

Band (formed after the album recording)
 Jennifer Haben – lead vocals
 Nils Lesser – lead guitar
 Christopher Hummels – rhythm guitar & backing vocals
 Erwin Schmidt – bass
 Tobias Derer – drums
 Michael Hauser – keyboards

Album musicians
 Jennifer Haben – lead vocals
 Sascha Paeth – guitars except on track 7; guitar solo on track 7; bass except on track 7; drums on tracks 8, 10, 11, 12; shouts on track 10; keyboards on track 11
 Ossi Schaller – guitar solo on tracks 1, 3, 4
 Dirk Schlag – acoustic guitars on tracks 2, 5, 6
 Arno Krabman, Bent Wolff – guitars on track 7
 Peter Weihe – guitars on track 12
 Mark Nissen – bass on track 7; all other instruments and programming, additional guitars, strings & backing vocals except on tracks 8, 11, 12
 Hartmut Krech – all other instruments and programming, additional guitars, strings & backing vocals except on tracks 8, 11, 12
 Ivo Moring – drums on track 10
 Michael 'Miro' Rodenberg – keyboards on tracks 8, 10, 11, 12
 Thorsten Brötzmann – keyboards on tracks 8, 10, 12
 Michael Knauer – keyboards on track 12
 Sandro Friedrich – flutes on tracks 1, 5, 6; bagpipes on track 1; shawn on track 5
 Ingo Hampf – lute on track 5
 Hannes Braun – lead vocals on track 5, backing vocals on track 3, shouts on track 4
 Billy King – backing vocals on tracks 2-4, 6-10
 Klaus Esch, Vibeke Andressen – backing vocals on track 6
 Oliver Hartmann – backing vocals on track 11
 Sander Gommans – backing vocals on track 6, shouts on track 6
 Kevin Ratajczak – shouts on track 6, 9
 Christopher Hummels – shouts on track 7

Production
Hartmut Krech, Mark Nissen – producers, engineers and mixing on tracks 1-7 and 9
Hannes Braun – co-producer on tracks 3 and 6
Thorsten Brötzmann, Ivo Morig – producers on tracks 8, 10, 12
Sascha Paeth – producer on tracks 8, 10, 11, 12
Michael 'Miro' Rodenberg – mastering at GateStudio, Wolfsburg, Germany

Charts

External links

Songs of Love and Death at Encyclopaedia Metallum

References

2015 debut albums
Beyond the Black albums